Ahmadjon Odilov (Uzbek Cyrillic: Аҳмаджон Одилов; 1 May 1925 – 25 September 2017) was an Uzbek politician. He was Hero of Socialist Labor (1965), and member of the Central Auditing Commission of the Communist Party of the Soviet Union (CPSU) between 1966 and 1971.

Odilov was a delegate to the XXIII, XXIV and XXV Congresses of CPSU (1966, 1971, and 1976), and a deputy of the Supreme Soviet of the USSR of the 9th and 10th convocations (1974–1984). He was also a member of the Presidium of the Supreme Soviet of the USSR and was elected to the Supreme Soviet of the Uzbek SSR three times.

Biography 
Odilov was born on 1 May 1925 in Gurumsaray, Pap District, Fergana, Uzbek SSR, Soviet Union (now Uzbekistan). From childhood he worked in agriculture. In the 1960-1970s, he was chairman of the collective farm named after Lenin in Pap District, Fergana.

Odilov died at his home on 27 September 2017 in Pap District, Namangan, Uzbekistan.

Awards 
 Hero of Socialist Labour (1 March 1965)
 three Order of Lenin (1 March 1965; 8 April 1971; 10 December 1973)
 Order of the October Revolution (25 December 1976)

Books 
In 2019, Uzbek writer Ortiqali Nomozov's Odilovni otmoqchi edilar was published by Yangi kitob. The book, focusing on Odilov, describes suffering, experiences, efforts to break the will of prisoners and their physical destructions in prison.

References 

1925 births
2017 deaths
20th-century Uzbekistani politicians